The monastic community of Mount Athos  is an Eastern Orthodox community of monks in Greece who hold the status of an autonomous region as well as the combined rights of a  decentralized administration, a region and a municipality, with a territory encompassing the distal part of the Athos peninsula including Mount Athos. The bordering proximal part of the peninsula belongs to the regular Aristotelis community in Central Macedonia.

In modern Greek, the community is commonly referred to as  translating to 'Holy Mountain', while Oros Athos is used to denote the physical mountain and Hersonissos tou Atho in respect to peninsula.

The community includes 20 monasteries and the settlements that they depend on. The monasteries house around 2,000 Eastern Orthodox monks from Greece and many other countries, including Eastern Orthodox countries such as Romania, Moldova, Georgia, Bulgaria, Montenegro, Serbia and Russia, who live an ascetic life at Athos, isolated from the rest of the world. The Athonite monasteries feature a rich collection of well-preserved artifacts, rare books, ancient documents, and artworks of immense historical value, and Mount Athos has been listed as a World Heritage Site since 1988.

Although Mount Athos is legally part of the European Union like the rest of Greece, the Monastic community institutions have a special jurisdiction which was reaffirmed during the admission of Greece to the European Community (precursor to the EU). This empowers the monastic community's authorities to restrict the free movement of people and goods in its territory; in particular, only males are allowed to enter, while women and most female animals are banned from Mount Athos by religious tradition of the community which lives there.

Political structure 

A territory of Greece, the monastic community enjoys autonomous self-government. The Greek Ministry of Foreign Affairs manages relations between the monastic community and the Government of Greece. 

Karyes is the administrative center and the seat of the synod and of the Civil Administrator of Mount Athos with his staff of lay people in the service of the monastic community.

The monasteries of the monastic community are stauropegic, i.e. they are exempt from the authority of the local bishop and only report to the Ecumenical Patriarch of Constantinople.

Administration and organization 
According to the constitution of Greece, the territory of the monastic community which is "[t]he Athos peninsula extending beyond Megali Vigla and constituting  the region of Agio Oros" is, "following ancient privilege", "a self-governed part of the Greek State, whose sovereignty thereon shall remain intact". The constitution also states that "[a]ll persons  leading a monastic life thereon acquire Greek citizenship without further formalities, upon admission as novices or monks." The constitution states "[h]eterodox  or schismatic persons" are forbidden to stay on the territory. The community consists of 20 main monasteries which constitute the Holy Community. Karyes is home to a civil administrator as the representative of the Greek state. The governor is an executive appointee.

The monastic community is under the direct jurisdiction of the Ecumenical Patriarch of Constantinople Bartholomew I.

Administration 
Civil authorities are represented by the civil administrator, appointed by the Greek Ministry of Foreign Affairs. He supervises the function of the institutions and the public order.

Each of the 20 monasteries is administered by an archimandrite elected by the monks for life. The Convention of the brotherhood (Γεροντία) is the legislative body. Each of the other establishments (sketes, cells, huts, retreats, and hermitages) is a dependency of one of the 20 monasteries and is assigned to the monks by a document called omologon (ομόλογον).

Monks 
All persons leading a monastic life in the monastic community receive Greek citizenship  upon admission as novices or monks. Laymen can visit the monastic community, but they need a special permit known as a diamonitirion.

In 17 of the monasteries, the monks are predominantly ethnic Greek. The Helandariou Monastery is Serbian and Montenegrin, the Zografou Monastery is Bulgarian and the Agiou Panteleimonos monastery is Russian.

Most of the sketes are also predominantly ethnic Greek; however, two sketes are Romanian. They are the coenobitic "Skētē Timiou Prodromou" (under Megistis Lavras Monastery) and the idiorrhythmic "Skētē Agiou Dēmētriou tou Lakkou", also called "Lakkoskētē" (under to the Agiou Pavlou monastery). A third skete is Russian, "Skētē Bogoroditsa" (under the Agiou Panteleimonos monastery).

The Greek language is commonly used in all the Greek monasteries, but in some monasteries there are other languages in use: in Agiou Panteleimonos, Russian (67 monks in 2011); in Hilandar Monastery, Serbian (58); in Zographou Monastery and Skiti Bogoroditsa, Bulgarian (32); and in Timiou Prodromou and Lakkoskiti, Romanian (64). Today, many of the Greek monks also speak foreign languages. Since there are monks from many nations in Athos, they naturally also speak their own native languages.

History

Byzantine era: the first monasteries 

The chroniclers Theophanes the Confessor (end of 8th century) and Georgios Kedrenos (11th century) wrote that the 726 eruption of the Thera volcano was visible from Mount Athos, indicating that it was inhabited at the time. The historian Genesios recorded that monks from Athos participated at the seventh Ecumenical Council of Nicaea of 787. Following the Battle of Thasos in 829, Athos was deserted for some time due to the destructive raids of the Cretan Saracens. Around 860, the famous monk Euthymios the Younger came to Athos.

In 958, the monk Athanasios the Athonite arrived on Mount Athos. In 962 he built the large central church of the Protaton in Karyes. In the next year, with the support of his friend Emperor Nicephorus Phocas, the monastery of Great Lavra was founded, still the largest and most prominent of the twenty monasteries existing today. It enjoyed the protection of the Byzantine emperors during the following centuries, and its wealth and possessions grew considerably. Alexios I Komnenos, who was the Byzantine Emperor from 1081 to 1118, gave Mount Athos complete autonomy from the Ecumenical Patriarch and the Bishop of Ierissos, and also exempted the monasteries from taxation. Furthermore, until 1312, the Protos of Karyes was directly appointed by the Byzantine Emperor.

The first charter of Mount Athos, signed in 972 by Emperor John Tzimiskes, Athanasius the Athonite, and 46 hegumenoi, is currently kept at the Protaton in Karyes. It is also known as the Tragos ('goat'), since it was written on goatskin parchment. The second charter or typikon of Mount Athos was written in September 1045 and signed by 180 hegumenoi. Emperor Constantine IX Monomachos ratified the typikon with an imperial chrysobull in June 1046. This charter was also the first official document that referred to Mount Athos as the "Holy Mountain."

From 985 to 1287, there was a Benedictine monastery on Mount Athos (between Magisti Lavra and Philotheou Karakallou) known as Amalphion after the people of Amalfi who founded it. The monastery was founded with support of John the Iberian, a Georgian and the founder of the Iviron Monastery, and is thought to have influenced Latin Christian monasticism and piety.

The Fourth Crusade in the 13th century brought new Roman Catholic overlords, which forced the monks to complain and ask for the intervention of Pope Innocent III until the restoration of the Byzantine Empire. The peninsula was raided by Catalan mercenaries in the 14th century in the so-called Catalan vengeance due to which the entry of people of Catalan origin was prohibited until 2005. The 14th century also saw the theological conflict over the hesychasm practised on Mount Athos and defended by Gregory Palamas (Άγιος Γρηγόριος ο Παλαμάς). In late 1371 or early 1372 the Byzantines defeated an Ottoman attack on Athos.

Serbian era and influences 
Serbian lords of the Nemanjić dynasty offered financial support to the monasteries of Mount Athos, while some of them also made pilgrimages and became monks there. Stefan Nemanja helped build the Hilandar monastery on Mount Athos together with his son Archbishop Saint Sava in 1198.

From 1342 until 1372 Mount Athos was under Serbian administration.  Serbian Emperor Stefan Dušan helped Mount Athos with many large donations to all monasteries. In the charter of emperor Stefan Dušan to the Monastery of Hilandar the Emperor gave to the monastery Hilandar direct rule over many villages and churches, including the church of Svetog Nikole u Dobrušti in Prizren, the church of Svetih Arhanđela in Štip, the Church of Svetog Nikole in Vranje and surrounding lands and possessions. He also gave large possessions and donations to the Karyes Hermitage of St. Sabas and the Holy Archangels in Jerusalem. Empress Helena, wife of the Emperor Stefan Dušan, was among the very few women allowed to visit and stay in Mount Athos, to protect her from the plague.
She avoided breaking the ban by not touching the ground for her entire visit, being constantly carried in a hand carriage.

Thanks to the donations by Dušan, the Serbian monastery of Hilandar was enlarged to more than 10,000 hectares, thus having the largest possessions on Mount Athos among other monasteries, and occupying 1/3 of the area. Serbian nobleman Antonije Bagaš, together with Nikola Radonja, bought and restored the ruined Agiou Pavlou monastery between 1355 and 1365, becoming its abbot.

The time of the Serbian Empire was a prosperous period for Hilandar and of other monasteries in Mount Athos and many of them were restored and rebuilt and significantly enlarged.

Serbian princess Mara Branković was the second Serbian woman that was granted permissions to visit the area. At the end of the 15th century five monasteries on Mount Athos had Serbian monks and were under the Serbian Prior: Docheiariou, Grigoriou, Ayiou Pavlou, Ayiou Dionysiou and Hilandar

Ottoman era 
The Byzantine Empire ceased to exist in the 15th century and the Ottoman Empire took its place.

From the account of the Rus' pilgrim Isaiah, by the end of the 15th century monasteries in Mount Athos represented monastic communities from large and diverse parts of the Balkans (Slavic, Albanian, Greek). Other monasteries listed by him bear no such designations. In particular, Docheiariou, Grigoriou, Ayiou Pavlou, Ayiou Dionysiou, and Chilandariou were Serbian; Karakalou and Philotheou were Albanian; Panteleïmon was Russian; Simonopetra was Bulgarian; Great Lavra, Vatopedi, Pantokratoros and Stavronikita were Greek; and Zographou, Kastamonitou, Xeropotamou, Koutloumousiou, Xenophontos, Iviron and Protaton did not bear any designation.

Sultan Selim I was a substantial benefactor of the Xeropotamou monastery. In 1517, he issued a fatwa and a Hatt-i Sharif ("noble edict") that "the place, where the Holy Gospel is preached, whenever it is burned or even damaged, shall be erected again." He also endowed privileges to the Abbey and financed the construction of the dining area and underground of the Abbey as well as the renovation of the wall paintings in the central church that were completed between the years 1533–1541.

This new way of monastic organization was an emergency measure taken by the monastic communities to counter their harsh economic environment. Contrary to the cenobitic system, monks in idiorrhythmic communities have private property, work for themselves, they are solely responsible for acquiring food and other necessities and they dine separately in their cells, only meeting with other monks at church. At the same time, the monasteries' abbots were replaced by committees and at Karyes the Protos was replaced by a four-member committee.

In 1749, with the establishment of the Athonite Academy near Vatopedi monastery, the local monastic community took a leading role in the modern Greek Enlightenment movement of the 18th century. This institution offered high level education, especially under Eugenios Voulgaris, where ancient philosophy and modern physical science were taught.

Late modern times
In modern times after the end of Ottoman rule new Serbian kings from the Obrenović dynasty and Karađorđević dynasty and the new bourgeois class resumed their support of Mount Athos.

In November 1912, during the First Balkan War, the Ottomans were forced out by the Greek Navy.

In June 1913, a small Russian fleet, consisting of the gunboat Donets and the transport ships Tsar and Kherson, delivered the archbishop of Vologda, and a number of troops to Mount Athos to intervene in the theological controversy over imiaslavie (a Russian Orthodox movement).

Maryse Choisy entered the monastic community in the 1920s disguised as a sailor.  She later wrote about her escapade in Un mois chez les hommes ("A Month with Men"). In the 1930s, Aliki Diplarakou dressed as a man and snuck into the monastic community. Her stunt was discussed in a 13 July 1953 Time magazine article entitled "The Climax of Sin".

A monk named Mihailo Tolotos is claimed to have lived in the monastic community from ca. 1855-1856 to 1938. On October 29, 1938, the American community newspaper Edinburg Daily Courier of Edinburg, Indiana reported that Tolotos had died at the age of 82. Reportedly, Tolotos had never seen a woman in his life, his mother having died in childbirth and he was brought up in the monastery by the monks. His 1938 death was again mentioned in January 7, 1949 edition of Raleigh Register in an Nixon Furniture Company advertisement, saying he lived a secluded life in the monastery, suggesting he may have never left the monastery.

Following outbreak of World War II, Time magazine described during the German invasion of Greece in 1941 a bombing attack near the monastic community, "The Stukas swooped across the Aegean skies like dark, dreadful birds, but they dropped no bombs on the monks of Mount Athos". During the German occupation of Greece,  the Epistassia formally asked Adolf Hitler to place the monastic community under his personal protection. Hitler agreed and received the title  "High Protector of the Holy Mountain" from the monks. The monastic community was able to avoid significant damage during the war.

Contemporary times 
After the war, a Special Double Assembly passed the constitutional charter of the monastic community, which was then ratified by the Greek Parliament. 

In 1953, Cora Miller, an American Fulbright Program teacher, landed briefly along with two other women, stirring up a controversy among the local monks.

After the dissolution of the Yugoslav Communist regime and Socialist Yugoslavia many presidents and prime ministers of Serbia visited Mount Athos.

A 2003 resolution of the European Parliament requested the lifting of the ban for violating "the universally recognised principle of gender equality".

On 26 May 2008, five Moldovans illegally entered Greece by way of Turkey, ending up in the monastic community. Four of these migrants were women. The monks forgave them for trespassing and informed them that the area was forbidden to females.

In January 2008 about a dozen Greek women violated the 1,000-year ban on females during a protest over disputed land.

In 2018, the monastic community became an issue in Greece-Russia relations when the Greek government denied entry to Russian clerics headed for the monastic community.  The media reported allegations that the Russian Federation was using the monastic community as a base for intelligence operations in Greece. In October 2018 the Moscow Patriarchate broke communion with the Ecumenical Patriarchate banned its adherents from visiting sites controlled by Patriarch Bartholomew I of Constantinople including the monastic community, in retaliation for  his decision to grant autocephaly to the Orthodox Church of Ukraine.

In the context of the Russian invasion of Ukraine and related sanctions, in 2022 the money-laundering authority of Greece launched an investigation into the suspicious transfer of large funds from Russia to Russia-friendly monasteries and monks at Mount Athos. Several senior Russian officials had visited Mount Athos in the preceding months.

Monastic life 
The monasteries of Mount Athos have a history of opposing ecumenism, or movements towards reconciliation between the Orthodox Church of Constantinople and the  Catholic Church. The Esphigmenou monastery is particularly outspoken in this respect, having raised black flags to protest against the meeting of Patriarch Athenagoras I of Constantinople and Pope Paul VI in 1972. Esphigmenou was subsequently expelled from the representative bodies of the Athonite Community. The conflict escalated in 2002 with Patriarch Bartholomew I of Constantinople declaring the monks of Esphigmenou an illegal brotherhood and ordering their eviction; the monks refused to be evicted, and the Patriarch ordered a new brotherhood to replace them.

The monasteries also have opposed ecumenism between the Orthodox Church of Constantinople and Oriental Orthodox Churches. Following the First and Second Agreed Statements published by the Joint Commission of the Theological Dialogue between the Orthodox Church and the Oriental Orthodox Churches in 1989 and 1990 respectively, and the subsequent Proposals for Lifting Anathemas in 1993, a committee formed by the monasteries published a responding memorandum expressing their condemnation of what they perceived to be an imminent false union with "the Non-Chalcedonians".

After reaching a low point of just 1,145 mainly elderly monks in 1971, the monasteries have been undergoing a steady and sustained renewal. By the year 2000, the monastic population had reached 1,610, with all 20 monasteries and their associated sketes receiving an infusion of mainly young, well-educated monks. In 2009, the population stood at nearly 2,000. Many younger monks possess university education and advanced skills that allow them to work on the cataloging and restoration of the Mountain's vast repository of manuscripts, vestments, icons, liturgical objects and other works of art, most of which remain unknown to the public because of their sheer volume. Projected to take several decades to complete, this restorative and archival work is funded by UNESCO and the EU, and aided by many academic institutions. The history of the modern revival of monastic life on Mount Athos and its entry into the technological world of the twenty-first century has been chronicled in Graham Speake's book, now in its second edition, Mount Athos. Renewal in Paradise.

Monasteries 

During religious celebrations, long vigils are typically held and the daily program is dramatically altered. The gate of the monastery closes by sunset and opens again by sunrise.

Many of the monasteries are dedicated to the Virgin Mary. Vatopedi and Philotheou are dedicated to the Annunciation, Agiou Pavlou to the Purification, Hilandar to the Presentation, and Iviron to the Dormition.

Cells 
A cell is a house with a small church where 1–3 monks live under the supervision of a monastery. Usually, each cell possesses a piece of land for agricultural or other use. Each cell has to organize some activities for income.

Sketes 

Small communities of neighbouring cells have developed since the beginning of monastic life in the monastic community, some of which using the word "skete" (σκήτη) meaning "monastic settlement" or "lavra" (λαύρα) meaning "monastic congregation". The word "skete" is of Coptic origin and in its original form is a placename of a location in the Egyptian desert known today as Scetis.

List of religious institutions

Twenty monasteries 
The sovereign monasteries, in the order of their place in the Athonite hierarchy:

Former monasteries
Papazôtos (1988) lists the following former 11th-century monasteries at Mount Athos, most of which are located northwest of Karyes.

Sketes 
A skete is a community of Christian hermits following a monastic rule, allowing them to worship in comparative solitude, while also affording them a level of mutual practical support and security. There are two kinds of sketes in Mount Athos. A coenobitic skete follows the style of monasteries. An idiorrhythmic skete follows the style of a small village: it has a common area of worship (a church), with individual hermitages or small houses around it, each one for a small number of occupants. The twelve main official sketes on Mount Athos are:

Other settlements and hermitages at Mount Athos that are sometimes referred to as "sketes" include  (Νέα Θηβαΐδα; a Russian skete), Little St. Anne's Skete, and the Skete of St. Basil (Άγιος Βασίλειος; a Greek-speaking skete). However, none of them are officially considered to sketes by the administration of Mount Athos.

Settlements 
The main settlements are:
 Karyes (main administrative center)
 Dafni (main port)

Other smaller settlements are:
Vigla
Agios Nilos
Kerasia
Karoulia
Katounakia
Kafsokalyvia
Vouleftiria
Provata
Morfonou
Kapsala

Law 
Daily visitors to Mount Athos are restricted to 100 lay Orthodox and 10 non-Orthodox male pilgrims, and all are required to obtain a special entrance permit from the Mount Athos Pilgrims' Bureau called the diamonitirion. Pilgrims pick up the permit from the Pilgrims' Bureau office in Thessaloniki and then present it at Ouranopoli or Ierissos before boarding the ferry to Mount Athos. This permit is valid for three days unless a monastery requests permission to extend it, or if an extension application is submitted at Karyes. Orthodox clergy are required to obtain a special entrance permit from the Patriarchate of Constantinople. Only men are permitted to visit the territory, which is called the "Garden of Virgin Mary" by the monks. Residents on the peninsula must be men aged 18 and over who are members of the Eastern Orthodox Church and also either monks or workers.

As part of measures to fight the COVID-19 pandemic, visits to Mount Athos were suspended from 19 March 2020 until 11 May 2021.

Prohibition on entry of women 

The monastic community bans women and female animals from entry in what is called an avaton (Άβατον). This intended to make living in celibacy easier for men who have chosen to do so. The main goal is to ensure celibacy, but also because the Virgin Mary alone represents her gender on Mount Athos, which is dedicated to her glory.

The ban was officially proclaimed by several emperors, including Constantine Monomachos, in a chrysobull of 1046.

Female domestic animals such as cows or sheep are also barred, the only exception being cats due to their mousing abilities.

Status in the European Union 
As part of an EU member state, Mount Athos is part of the European Union and, for the most part, subject to EU law. While outside the EU's Value Added Tax area, Mount Athos is within the Schengen Area. A declaration attached to Greece's accession treaty to the Schengen Agreement states that Mount Athos's "special status" should be taken into account in the application of the Schengen rules. The monks strongly objected to Greece joining the Schengen Area based on fears that the EU would be able to end the centuries-old prohibition on the admittance of women. The prohibition is unchanged and a special permit is required to enter the peninsula. The monks were also concerned that the agreement could affect their traditional right to offer sanctuary to people from Orthodox countries such as Russia. Such monks do nowadays need a Greek visa and permission to stay, even if that is given generously by the Greek ministry, based on requests from Athos.

See also 
 Meteora
 Okinoshima (Fukuoka)
 Footpaths of Mount Athos
 Antiathonas
 Byzantine Empire
 Eastern Orthodox Church
 Friends of Mount Athos
 Hesychasm
 History of the Byzantine Empire
 List of historic Greek countries and regions
 New Athos
 Postage stamps and postal history of Mount Athos

Bibliography 
 Holy Mountain. Stone Arched Bridges and Aqueducts by Frangiscos Martinos. Edited by Dimitri Michalopoulos (Athens, 2019).
 Mount Athos  by Sotiris Kadas. An illustrated guide to the monasteries and their history (Athens 1998). With many illustrations of the Byzantine art treasures on Mount Athos.
 Athos The Holy Mountain by Sydney Loch. Published 1957 & 1971 (Librairie Molho, Thessaloniki). Loch spent most of his life in the Byzantine tower at Ouranopolis, close to Athos, and describes his numerous visits to the Holy Mountain.
 The Station: Athos: Treasures and Men by Robert Byron. First published 1931, reprinted with an introduction by John Julius Norwich, 1984.
 Dare to be Free  by Walter Babington Thomas. Offers insights into the lives of the monks of Mt Athos during World War II, from the point of view of an escaped POW who spent a year on the peninsula evading capture.
 Blue Guide: Greece , pp. 600–03. Offers history and tourist information.
 Mount Athos: Renewal in Paradise , by Graham Speake. Published by Yale University Press in 2002. An extensive book about Athos in the past, the present and the future. Includes valuable tourist information. Features numerous full-colour photographs of the peninsula and daily life in the monasteries. 2nd edition published by Denise Harvey in 2014, which includes revisions, updates, and a new chapter documenting the changes that have occurred in the twelve years since its first publication.
 From the Holy Mountain by William Dalrymple. . Published 1997.
 Ульянов О. Г. The influence of the monasticism of Holy Mount Athos on the liturgical reform movement in the Late Byzantine // Church, Society and Monasticism. The second international monastic symposium at Sant’Anselmo. Roma, 2006.
 Ivanov, Emil: Das Bildprogramm des Narthex im Rila-Kloster in Bulgarien unter besonderer Berücksichtigung der Wasserweihezyklen auf dem Athos, Diss., Erlangen, 2002.
 Ivanov, Emil: Apokallypsedarstellungen in der nachbyzantinischen Kunst, in: Das Münster, 3, 2002, 208–217.
 Encounters on the Holy Mountain: Stories from Mount Athos , P. Howorth, C. Thomas (eds). Published by Brepols in 2020.
 Leigh Fermor, Patrick: The Broken Road. The final volume of his original trilogy, edited by Colin Thubron and Artemis Cooper, has an excellent descriptive tour around each of the main Monasteries, from his visit in January-February 1935.

References

External links 

 Mount Athos Center
 Mount Athos information guide
 A website about Athos
 Treasures of Mount Athos
 Friends of Mount Athos (FoMA) website
 Climbing the Holy Mountain (Friends of Mount Athos website)
 Mount Athos Foundation of America
 360° virtual panoramas from Athos
 Information and services for visitors
 Hilandar Monastery 
 Mount Athos, HD video
 Former official website of Mount Athos
 Athos Digital Heritage

Subdivisions of Greece
Ecumenical Patriarchate of Constantinople
Theocracies
Eastern Orthodoxy in Greece

Men's religious organizations
Autonomous regions
Special territories of the European Union